The gaita cabreiresa (or gaita llionesa (lhionesa)) was a type of bagpipe native to the comarca of La Cabreira, in the Spanish  province of León.

The instrument had become extinct, but was revived through the efforts of bagpiper Moises Liebana and ethnographer Concha Casado in the 1990s.

References

Bagpipes
Spanish musical instruments
Reconstructed musical instruments
Music of León, Spain